Niklas Wagener (born 16 April 1998) is a German politician. Wagener became a member of the Bundestag in the 2021 German federal election. He is affiliated with the Alliance 90/The Greens party.

References

External links 
 

Living people
1998 births
Place of birth missing (living people)
21st-century German politicians
Members of the Bundestag for Alliance 90/The Greens
Members of the Bundestag 2021–2025